The North Norfolk Railway, a heritage line operating in Norfolk, England, has a large collection of heritage rolling stock, mostly relating to the London and North Eastern Railway (LNER) branch lines in Norfolk.  The rolling stock preserved on the North Norfolk Railway is used to operate trains on the NNR, also known as the "Poppy Line", which runs between the coastal town of Sheringham and Holt.  Some vehicles are also approved to operate over Network Rail, mostly in connection with dining services to Cromer.

There is a variety of preserved steam and diesel locomotives and diesel multiple units, passenger coaches and goods wagons. Some are owned by the railway itself but most are owned by individuals or voluntary groups. The line is also regularly visited by locomotives based elsewhere.

Maintenance facilities
The main restoration sheds are at Weybourne. These have space to accommodate four standard length British Railways Mark 1 coaches and six large steam or diesel locomotives. Additional carriage storage sheds have been built near Holt, using Heritage Lottery Funding. These have the capacity to store the equivalent of 18 Mark 1 coaches.

Information about rolling stock available from: www.nnrailway.co.uk/rolling_stock/

Steam locomotives

Operational

Undergoing Overhaul/Repairs

Away on loan

Visiting Steam Locomotives
None at present.

Diesel locomotives

Operational

Undergoing overhaul/repairs

Locomotive in Store

Visiting Diesel Locomotives
BR class 20, 20227, "Sherlock Holmes". Is fully mainline certified and used for Cromer dining trains. On loan from the Class 20 Association.

Diesel multiple and single units

Operational
BR Class 101 51188 (on loan from the Ecclesbourne Valley Railway) + BR Class 101 56352 (on loan from the National Railway Museum) 
BR Class 101 51228 - BR Green, built in 1958. + BR Class 101 56062 - BR Green, Built in 1957. Owned by the M&GN joint railway society.

Under Repair/Restoration

 BR Class 101 51192 (on loan from the National Railway Museum)

BR Class 104 56182 (undergoing major restoration) BR Green, Built in 1958.
BR Class 104 50479 (undergoing major restoration) BR Green, Built in 1958.

Away on loan
BR Waggon- und Maschinenbau GmbH Donauwörth railbus 79960, built 1958, on loan to the Ribble Steam Railway

On-track plant
TRAMM – DR 98801 ex-Balfour Beatty Track Renewal & Maintenance Machine (operational)

Coaching stock

BR Mark 1 carriages

Operational

Non-Operational/ In Works

BR Mark 3 carriages

Specialist carriages

Suburban coaches
Part of the Suburban 4 project, funded by a £99,500 from the Heritage Lottery Fund, to restore four of these coaches together to complement the vintage Quad Art set which they replaced in the 1950s.

"Quad Art" coaches
Short for "Quad-Articulated", this unique set of permanently coupled coaches have been overhauled and restored in LNER varnished teak condition.  Used as the backbone of NNR services until 1979, due to the age and historical importance of these coaches they are now only used periodically throughout the year.  They were restored using a match funded Heritage Lottery grant of £341,000, with an additional £308,000 grant from the Heritage Lottery Fund providing the Bridge Road Carriage Sheds, which were built to store the Quad-Art set.

"Mainline Set" Coaches
These LNER carriages are, or will be, restored externally to British Railways 1950's/60's condition in Crimson/Cream livery.

"Vintage Set" Coaches
These carriages are or will be restored to form a rake of Victorian 4 or 6 Wheeler Carriages.

Passenger rated vans
These vans are usually coupled to the railway's regular passenger trains. Their purpose is to carry pushcarts and bicycles for passengers.

Brake vans

Goods wagons
The North Norfolk Railway also operate a number of goods vehicles.  These are classified as either 'operational' for use in engineering trains, 'heritage' which are suitable for use in a demonstration heritage freight train that is used on special occasions, or 'museum' if only allowed to run short distances.

Former North Norfolk Railway rolling stock 
Since the preservation reopening of the line, several items of rolling stock have worked or been based on the North Norfolk Railway, but have since departed. A number of vehicles have also been stripped and partially (or fully) scrapped on the railway.

Steam locomotives and shunters previously based on the NNR

Diesel locomotives and shunters previously based on the NNR

Diesel multiple and single units previously based on the NNR

Carriages previously based on the NNR

References

Rail transport in Norfolk
North Norfolk Railway
North Norfolk Railway